Anthony Federico DePalma (October 12, 1904 – April 6, 2005) was an orthopedic surgeon, humanitarian, and teacher at Thomas Jefferson University, as well as the founder of the orthopedic department at University of Medicine and Dentistry of New Jersey.

References

External links
Obituary in the Philadelphia Inquirer
Thomas Jefferson University Hospital, Department of Orthopaedic Surgery: History
Sun-Sentinel obituary

1904 births
2005 deaths
American orthopedic surgeons
American centenarians
Men centenarians
Physicians from Philadelphia
University of Medicine and Dentistry of New Jersey faculty
University of Maryland, College Park alumni
Jefferson Medical College alumni
Thomas Jefferson University faculty
United States Navy personnel of World War II
United States Navy Medical Corps officers
20th-century surgeons